Christopher (Toby) McLeod is the project director of Earth Island Institute's Sacred Land Film Project, which he founded in 1984 as one of Earth Island's original projects. Since 2006 he has been producing and directing the four-part documentary film series Standing on Sacred Ground, which premiered in 2013 at the Mill Valley Film Festival and aired nationally on PBS in 2015. Standing on Sacred Ground  features eight indigenous communities around the world fighting to protect their sacred places. The award-winning series visits Altaians in Russia, the Winnemem Wintu in northern California, Papua New Guinea, the tar sands of Canada, the Gamo Highlands of Ethiopia, Peru, Australia and Hawaii. McLeod produced and directed the award-winning documentary In the Light of Reverence (2001) and has made three other award-winning documentary films: The Four Corners: A National Sacrifice Area? (1983) with Glenn Switkes and Randy Hayes, (Winner of the Student Academy Award). Downwind/Downstream (1988) with Robert Lewis, and NOVA: Poison in the Rockies (1990). His first film was the 9-minute short The Cracking of Glen Canyon Damn—with Edward Abbey and Earth First! (1982) with Glenn Switkes and Randy Hayes. The focus of these educational projects has been to increase public awareness and understanding of sacred natural sites, indigenous peoples' cultural practices and worldviews, and environmental justice.

References

External links 
 Sacred Land Film Project Website
 Sacred Land Film Project Staff Bios
 PBS Interview of Christopher (Toby) McLeod
 PBS POV Website on movie
 In the Light of Reverence Wikipedia
 
 In the Light of Reverence on IMDB
 Standing on Sacred Ground film series website

Year of birth missing (living people)
Living people
American documentary film directors